Hurand County is in East Azerbaijan province, Iran. The capital of the county is the city of Hurand. At the 2006 census, the county's population as Hurand District of Ahar County was 22,528 in 4,744 households. The following census in 2011 counted 21,089 people in 5,504 households. At the 2016 census, Hurand District's population was 20,701, in 6,154 households, after which the district was separated from the county to form Hurand County.

Administrative divisions

The population history of Hurand County's administrative divisions (as a district of Ahar County) over three consecutive censuses is shown in the following table.

Upon the establishment of Hurand County, it has been structured as follows:

References

Counties of East Azerbaijan Province

fa:شهرستان هوراند